Bradley C. Harrison (born March 11, 1972) is a venture capitalist.  He is the founder and managing partner of Scout Ventures, a venture capital firm that offers entrepreneurs support and capital. Harrison specializes in early-stage companies with a focus on media, technology, and entertainment.  He holds three US patents in the search space.

Early life and education 

Harrison attended the United States Military Academy at West Point from 1990-1994 where he graduated as a Distinguished Honor Graduate with a B.S. in theoretical economics.
  
Harrison then attended the MIT Sloan School of Management from 1999-2001 where he graduated with an MBA.

Career
Harrison was an Airborne Ranger and served in the U.S. Army for 5 years where he became a captain.

Harrison founded Gladiator Group, a venture consulting firm, and also served as a Director at America Online where he was responsible for strategy, business development, and new revenue creation.

In 2004, Harrison served as Vice President of Strategic Partnerships and Distribution of MeMedia Inc.

In 2006, he founded his own venture firm, Brad Harrison Ventures. As an evolution of BHV, he launched the BHV Entrepreneurship Fund II to focus on early-stage venture capital. The Entrepreneurship Fund is focused on providing strategic capital to start-ups and start-overs with a Media, Technology and Entertainment focus. In August 2013, Harrison rebranded BHV to Scout Ventures. Previous investments include Social Weekend.

Harrison has been a board member of SeedInvest since April 2014.

Personal life
Harrison and his wife Angie live in Austin Texas and have a son, Elvis, and daughter, Scout.

References

External links 
 Scout Ventures Website 

1972 births
Living people
People from Tarrytown, New York
American venture capitalists
MIT Sloan School of Management alumni
United States Military Academy alumni
United States Army officers